David Erundino Giralt Agramonte (28 June 1959 – 13 April 2020) was a Cuban long jumper. His personal best jump was 8.22 metres, achieved in August 1979 in Montreal. He achieved that mark at the World Cup, and went on to represent Cuba at the 1980 Olympics in Moscow, Russia.
 He is the father of triple jumper Arnie David Giralt.

Achievements

References

1959 births
2020 deaths
Cuban male long jumpers
Cuban people of African descent
Athletes (track and field) at the 1979 Pan American Games
Athletes (track and field) at the 1980 Summer Olympics
Olympic athletes of Cuba
Cuban athletics coaches
Pan American Games medalists in athletics (track and field)
Pan American Games silver medalists for Cuba
Universiade medalists in athletics (track and field)
Central American and Caribbean Games gold medalists for Cuba
Competitors at the 1978 Central American and Caribbean Games
Universiade bronze medalists for Cuba
Central American and Caribbean Games medalists in athletics
Medalists at the 1977 Summer Universiade
Medalists at the 1979 Pan American Games